Elsinore Peak is a named  summit, at the southern end of the mountain ridge running southeast from the vicinity east of El Cariso in the Elsinore Mountains, in Riverside County, California in the United States.

References 

Mountains of Riverside County, California
Santa Ana Mountains
Cleveland National Forest
Mountains of Southern California